The 2013–14 season of the Belgian Second Division (also known as Belgacom League for sponsorship reasons) began on 2 August 2013 and ended on 27 April 2014.

Team changes
After promotion and relegation, only 15 teams of the previous season remained in the league, with 3 others being replaced:

Out
 Oostende were promoted as champions of the previous season.
 Oudenaarde was relegated to the Third Division after finishing 17th.
 Sint-Niklaas was relegated to the Third Division after finishing 18th.

In
 Hoogstraten promoted as champions from Third Division A.
 Virton promoted as champions from Third Division B.
 Verbroedering Geel-Meerhout was promoted after winning the third division playoffs and changed their name before the season started to ASV Geel.

Team information

Regular season

League table

Period winners
Like before, the season was divided into three periods. The first ten matchdays together form the first period, matchdays 11 to 22 form period two and the last 12 form period three. The three period winners take part in the Belgian Second Division Final Round together with the winner of the 2013–14 Belgian Pro League relegation playoff. The winner of this final round gets to play in the 2014–15 Belgian Pro League.

Eupen and Westerlo respectively won the first and second period and qualified for the final round. But as eventual champions Westerlo also won the third period, this left two spots open for Sint-Truiden and Mouscron-Péruwelz to qualify as highest placed finishers (third and fourth in the league respectively) who had not already qualified.

Period 1

Period 2

Period 3

Results

Season statistics

Top scorers
Source: Soccerway

Up to and including matches played on 16 May.

9 goals (7 players)

  Bart Goor (Dessel Sport)
  Florian Taulemesse (Eupen)
  Frédéric Gounongbe (RWDM Brussels)
  Mohammed Aoulad (Sint-Truiden)
  Joeri Dequevy (Sint-Truiden)
  Lonsana Doumbouya (Tubize)
  Philippe Liard (Tubize)

8 goals (8 players)

  Wesley Vanbelle (Aalst)
  Sandro Calabro (Antwerp)
  Sven De Rechter (Roeselare)
  Dieter Van Tornhout (Roeselare)
  Grégory Dufer (Sint-Truiden)
  Gary Ambroise (Tubize)
  Leandro Bailly (Tubize)
  Samy Kehli (Virton)

7 goals (7 players)

  Aleksandar Kolev (ASV Geel)
  Simon Vermeiren (Heist)
  Wouter Scheelen (Lommel United)
  Grégory Molnar (Virton)
  Arnaud Biatour (Visé)
  Fayçal Rherras (Visé)
  Basile de Carvalho (WS Brussels)

6 goals (8 players)

  Stavros Glouftsis (Aalst)
  Omar Bennassar (Dessel Sport)
  Phakamani Mngadi (Eupen)
  Moussa Traoré (Hoogstraten)
  Loris Brogno (Lommel United)
  Zinho Gano (Lommel United)
  Mathieu Cornet (Virton)
  Raphaël Lecomte (Westerlo)

5 goals (10 players)

  Jordan Faucher (Antwerp)
  Freddy Mombongo-Dues (Antwerp)
  Kevin Tano (Antwerp)
  Anice Badri (Mouscron-Péruwelz)
  Harlem Gnohéré (Mouscron-Péruwelz)
  Kevin Vandendriessche (Mouscron-Péruwelz)
  Sofian Kheyari (Tubize)
  Yohan Croizet (Virton)
  Laurens Paulussen (Westerlo)
  Jaime Ruiz (Westerlo)

4 goals (20 players)

  Arne Hoefnagels (ASV Geel)
  Marijn Steurs (ASV Geel)
  Romain Tainmont (Boussu Dour)
  Ratko Vansimpsen (Dessel Sport)
  Juan Ochoa (Eupen)
  Yannick Rymenants (Heist)
  Tom Boere (Hoogstraten)
  Ruben Tilburgs (Hoogstraten)
  Toon Lenaerts (Lommel United)
  Glenn Neven (Lommel United)
  Julian Michel (Mouscron-Péruwelz)
  Nicolas Perez (Mouscron-Péruwelz)
  Sami Lkoutbi (RWDM Brussels)
  Mikael Seoudi (RWDM Brussels)
  Yohan Dufour (Virton)
  Maxime Annys (Westerlo)
  Jens Cools (Westerlo)
  Kevin Vandenbergh (Westerlo)
  Amady Diop (WS Brussels)
  Mamadou Fall (WS Brussels)

3 goals (31 players)

  Donjet Shkodra (Aalst)
  Ken Van Damme (Aalst)
  Mathieu Manset (Antwerp)
  Jo Christiaens (ASV Geel)
  Kenneth Kerckhofs (ASV Geel)
  Lilian Bochet (Boussu Dour)
  Jean-François Christophe (Boussu Dour)
  Rachid Mourabit (Boussu Dour)
  Prince Asubonteng (Dessel Sport)
  Zico Gielis (Dessel Sport)
  Roy Meeus (Dessel Sport)
  Samuel Asamoah (Eupen)
  Bram Criel (Heist)
  Jonas Vandermarliere (Heist)
  Roy Van der Linden (Hoogstraten)
  Jentl Gaethofs (Lommel United)
  Thomas Jutten (Lommel United)
  Yohan Brouckaert (Mouscron-Péruwelz)
  Jean-François Mbuba (Roeselare)
  Nils Sarrazyn (Roeselare)
  Tortol Lembi (Sint-Truiden)
  Rob Schoofs (Sint-Truiden)
  Jonathan Heris (Tubize)
  Dugary Ndabashinze (Tubize)
  Hervé Onana (Tubize)
  David Vandenbroeck (Tubize)
  Jarno Molenberghs (Westerlo)
  Kenneth Schuermans (Westerlo)
  Leandro Trossard (Westerlo)
  Roméo Debefve (WS Brussels)
  Yannick Loemba (WS Brussels)

2 goals (36 players)

  Steve Bael (Aalst)
  Jonas Bogaerts (Aalst)
  Kevin Janssens (Aalst)
  Ben Santermans (Aalst)
  Nick Van Belle (Aalst)
  Salomon Nirisarike (Antwerp)
  Gideon Boateng (ASV Geel)
  Thomas Frederix (ASV Geel)
  Alexandre Lauriente (Boussu Dour)
  Hans Hannes (Dessel Sport)
  Dries Van Lommel (Dessel Sport)
  Anthony Bassey (Eupen)
  Alassane Diallo (Eupen)
  Manel Expósito (Eupen)
  Christian Kabasele (Eupen)
  Nick Van Huffel (Hoogstraten)
  Sam Vanaken (Lommel United)
  Benjamin Delacourt (Mouscron-Péruwelz)
  Abdoulay Diaby (Mouscron-Péruwelz)
  Antonio Jakoliš (Mouscron-Péruwelz)
  Dimitri Mohamed (Mouscron-Péruwelz)
  Petar Bojović (Roeselare)
  Yohan Boli (Roeselare)
  Marcos Camozzato (Roeselare)
  Hakan Bilgiç (RWDM Brussels)
  Hamid Bouyfoulkitne (RWDM Brussels)
  David Habarugira (RWDM Brussels)
  Guy Dufour (Sint-Truiden)
  Guillermo Méndez (Sint-Truiden)
  Pierre Gevaert (Tubize)
  Jonathan Benteke (Visé)
  Alessio Cascio (Visé)
  Daan De Pever (Visé)
  Ioannis Masmanidis (Visé)
  Luigi Vaccaro (Visé)
  Kevin Geudens (Westerlo)

1 goal (77 players)

  Armin Čerimagić (Aalst)
  Gianni De Neve (Aalst)
  Niels Martin (Aalst)
  Yves Ngasseu (Aalst)
  Mike Smet (Aalst)
  Thomas Weydisch (Aalst)
  Roy Bakkenes (Antwerp)
  John Bostock (Antwerp)
  David Iboma (Antwerp)
  Kelvin Maynard (Antwerp)
  Davide Petrucci (Antwerp)
  Christophe Bertjens (ASV Geel)
  Hannes Meeus (ASV Geel)
  Ken Van Mierlo (ASV Geel)
  Stefan Belic (Boussu Dour)
  Julien Berthomier (Boussu Dour)
  Chemcedine El Araichi (Boussu Dour)
  Nassim Saadi (Boussu Dour)
  Ivan Mateso (Dessel Sport)
  Kurt Remen (Dessel Sport)
  Kevin Tapoko (Dessel Sport)
  Jonathan D'Ostilio (Eupen)
  Raoul Kenne (Eupen)
  Mukoni Mata (Eupen)
  Lucas Porcar (Eupen)
  Ntuthoko Radebe (Eupen)
  Jorn Rijmenams (Heist)
  Raphaël Thys (Heist)
  Jeroen Vanderputte (Heist)
  Ivan Yagan (Heist)
  Bart Cornelissen (Hoogstraten)
  Koen Gommers (Hoogstraten)
  Milan Savić (Hoogstraten)
  Thijs Schrauwen (Hoogstraten)
  Jorne Segers (Hoogstraten)
  Glenn Van der Linden (Hoogstraten)
  Ken Debauve (Lommel United)
  Christopher Verbist (Lommel United)
  Sébastien Aliotte (Mouscron-Péruwelz)
  Sanaa Altama (Mouscron-Péruwelz)
  Anthony Bova (Mouscron-Péruwelz)
  Jérémy Huygebaert (Mouscron-Péruwelz)
  Thibault Peyre (Mouscron-Péruwelz)
  Daniel Ternest (Roeselare)
  Bram Vandenbussche (Roeselare)
  Geoffrey Cabeke (RWDM Brussels)
  Lanfia Camara (RWDM Brussels)
  Mahamoudou Kéré (RWDM Brussels)
  Kévin Nicaise (RWDM Brussels)
  Jérôme Nollevaux (RWDM Brussels)
  Naïm Aarab (Sint-Truiden)
  Giel Deferm (Sint-Truiden)
  Edmilson (Sint-Truiden)
  Yvan Erichot (Sint-Truiden)
  Alessandro Iandoli (Sint-Truiden)
  Mathias Schils (Sint-Truiden)
  Olivier Vinamont (Tubize)
  Guy Blaise (Virton)
  Simon Dupuis (Virton)
  Marvin Etienne (Virton)
  Valentin Focki (Virton)
  Arsène Menessou (Virton)
  Jordan Yéyé (Virton)
  Pierre-Alain Laloux (Visé)
  Philippe Janssens (Westerlo)
  Kennedy Nwanganga (Westerlo)
  Jeffrey Rentmeister (Westerlo)
  Jeroen Vanthournout (Westerlo)
  Chakhir Belghazouani (WS Brussels)
  Grégory Christ (WS Brussels)
  Mehdi Courgnaud (WS Brussels)
  Soufiane El Banouhi (WS Brussels)
  Michel Goffin (WS Brussels)
  Jessim Mahaya (WS Brussels)
  Hemza Mihoubi (WS Brussels)
  Elhadji Ndoye (WS Brussels)
  Noël Soumah (WS Brussels)

1 Own goal (10 players)

  Stijn Minne (ASV Geel, scored for Heist)
  Miguel Dachelet (Heist, scored for Tubize)
  Roel Engelen (Hoogstraten, scored for Eupen)
  Stéphane Pichot (Mouscron-Péruwelz, scored for Visé)
  Bram Vandenbussche (Roeselare, scored for Hoogstraten)
  Constant Delsanne (Tubize, scored for Lommel United)
  Philippe Liard (Tubize, scored for Eupen)
  Yoann Grosperrin (Virton, scored for Aalst)
  Luigi Vaccaro (Visé, scored for Lommel United)
  Elhadji Ndoye (WS Brussels, scored for Westerlo)

References

Belgian Second Division seasons
Bel
2013–14 in Belgian football